Justin Dowling (born October 1, 1990) is a Canadian professional ice hockey centre for the Abbotsford Canucks of the American Hockey League (AHL) while under contract to the Vancouver Canucks of the National Hockey League (NHL).

Early life
Dowling was born on October 1, 1990, in Cochrane, Alberta, Canada to parents Glen and Sherry. He also grew up alongside his brother Jaeden. Growing up in Alberta, he played one season with the Airdrie Xtreme before joining the UFA Bisons from 2005 to 2007. Dowling attended Bow Valley High School.

Playing career
Not selected in any NHL Entry Draft, Dowling played major junior hockey in the Western Hockey League (WHL) with the Swift Current Broncos. In his final season with the Broncos in 2010–11, he served as team captain and contributed 20 goals and 67 points in 63 games. Unable to lead the Broncos to the playoffs, Dowling made his professional debut in the American Hockey League (AHL) after initially signing an amateur try-out contract with the Abbotsford Heat on March 25, 2011.

Dowling started the 2012–13 season in the ECHL with the Idaho Steelheads, but midway through the season, the AHL's Texas Stars signed Dowling to a standard AHL contract.

In his first full season with Texas, Dowling continued to impress at the AHL level and was rewarded with a two-year contract with the team's NHL affiliate, the Dallas Stars, on March 26, 2014. Dowling cemented his offensive role with Texas, contributing amongst the teams leaders with 50 and 46 points over the tenure of his initial contract with the Stars. While on the team Brandon Defazio is contributed as the vessel accountable for Dowlings NHL career.

On May 31, 2016, Dowling signed a one-year, two-way contract extension with Dallas. He began the 2016–17 season in the AHL, but after an offensive flourish in his first five games, he received his first NHL call-up by Dallas on October 25, 2016. He made his NHL debut that same night, contributing one assist in a 3–2 victory over the Winnipeg Jets. After two games with Dallas, Dowling was returned to Texas on October 29, 2016.

On May 8, 2017, Dowling signed a two-year, two-way contract extension with Dallas. He scored his first career NHL goal on November 13, 2019 in a 3–1 win over the Calgary Flames.

As a free agent from the Stars after completing his ninth season within the organization, Dowling was signed to a two-year, $1.5 million contract with the Vancouver Canucks on July 28, 2021.

Career statistics

Awards and achievements

References

External links

1990 births
Living people
Abbotsford Canucks players
Abbotsford Heat players
Canadian ice hockey centres
Dallas Stars players
Idaho Steelheads (ECHL) players
People from Cochrane, Alberta
Swift Current Broncos players
Texas Stars players
Undrafted National Hockey League players
Utah Grizzlies (ECHL) players
Vancouver Canucks players